Elbis Sousa Nascimento (born 26 December 1992 in Maranhão, Brazil), known as just Elbis, is a Brazilian professional footballer who plays for Cafetaleros de Chiapas of Ascenso MX.

Honours
Atlante
Liga de Expansión MX: Apertura 2021

References

External links

ascensomx.net

Liga MX players
Living people
1992 births
Brazilian footballers
Brazilian expatriate footballers
Atlético Madrid B players
Clube Atlético Penapolense players
Paraná Clube players
Atlético Clube Goianiense players
Coras de Nayarit F.C. footballers
Club Atlético Zacatepec players
C.F. Pachuca players
Cafetaleros de Chiapas footballers
Campeonato Brasileiro Série B players
Ascenso MX players
Segunda División B players
Sportspeople from Maranhão
Association football defenders
Expatriate footballers in Spain
Expatriate footballers in Mexico
Brazilian expatriate sportspeople in Spain
Brazilian expatriate sportspeople in Mexico